Bartolo is an Italian surname. Notable people with the surname include:

Evarist Bartolo (born 1952), Maltese politician
Augusto Bartolo (1883–1937), Maltese politician, journalist, and judge
Sal Bartolo (1917–2002), American boxer
Yorman Polas Bartolo (born 1985), Cuban basketball player 
Andrea di Bartolo (c. 1421 – 1457), 15th century Florentine painter
Andrea del Bartolo (1460–1524), 15th century Milanese painter
Andrea di Bartolo (1360/70–1428), 14th century Siennese painter

See also
Bartolo (given name)

Italian-language surnames
Surnames from given names